Oye-Plage is a commune in the Pas-de-Calais department in the Hauts-de-France region of France.

Geography
The commune is nearly a mile from the English Channel.

History
The commune has ancient origins. The name is first recorded as Ogia in the 8th century, which means 'island' ( Protogermanic *aujō), was used for those islands that survived high tides.

The Vikings landed here in 879 with the aim of invading Moriny.

In the county of Boulogne until 1259, Oye belonged to the counts of Artois until 1346, the English until 1558 and to the Kings of France since that date, under the name of Oye county.

It was at Oye chateau that a peace treaty was signed on 6 July 1439 between France and England. 
There is nothing left of the castle and adjacent forts which were tasked to block the road against first the Flemish and then the Spanish.

The only witness to the past, the church tower, restored in 1953, was built by the English in 1553 under the reign of Mary I of England.
In the church, dedicated to Saint-Médard, were buried many English killed during the siege of Calais in 1346, and the dead of the French army killed while taking Calais at the Battle of Gravelines (1558).

The port gradually silted-up and was finally closed in the eighteenth century.

On 27 September 1992 the town of Oye-Plage was twinned with the small English village of Capel-le-Ferne.

Population

Places of interest
La Tour Penchée : A blockhouse built in the shape of a church steeple. Its purpose was to deceive the Allied airmen who were bombing targets in Germany, as they often used visual cues for directions. This false tower could be confused with that of the town situated a few kilometres further south. When the war ended, they tried to destroy the building with explosives. It was not enough. Now the tower leans about twenty degrees, hence its name (penchée = leaning).
 The modern church of St.Médard.
 The remains of the château, which was subject to many invasions, (by the Comte de Flandres, the Duke de Bourgogne etc.) and was razed in 1558.
 A brick-built windmill.
 The  Nature Reserve of the Platier d'Oye, created in 1987.
 The  beach.
 The war memorial, built in 1920.

See also
Communes of the Pas-de-Calais department

References

External links

 Official commune website 

Oyeplage
Pale of Calais